Kagalnitsky District is an administrative and municipal district (raion), one of the forty-three in Rostov Oblast, Russia. It is located in the southwest of the oblast. Its administrative center is the rural locality (a stanitsa) of Kagalnitskaya. Population: 30,489 (2010 Census);  The population of Kagalnitskaya accounts for 22.4% of the district's total population.

References

Notes

Sources

Districts of Rostov Oblast